Black River Plantation House, also known as Rice Hope Plantation, Black River; and International Paper Company House, is a historic home located near Georgetown in Georgetown County, South Carolina.  It was built in 1919, and is a -story, Neo-Classical Revival frame house. It is clad in weatherboard and has a hipped roof. The riverside façade features a portico supported by four columns with Corinthian order capitals. The house was purchased by the International Paper Company in 1942, and used by company employees and guests as a resort.

It was listed on the National Register of Historic Places in 1994.

References

Houses on the National Register of Historic Places in South Carolina
Houses completed in 1919
Neoclassical architecture in South Carolina
National Register of Historic Places in Georgetown County, South Carolina
Houses in Georgetown County, South Carolina